Allium chodsha-bakirganicum is a plant species endemic to Kyrgyzstan.

References

chodsha-bakirganicum
Onions
Flora of Kyrgyzstan
Plants described in 1991